Joseph C. Wilson Magnet High School, sometimes referred to as Wilson Magnet or just Wilson, is a public high school in Rochester, New York. It is in the Rochester City School District.

Performance
Wilson Magnet performs better than other high schools in the Rochester school district, but is still below state averages in terms of standardized testing. Wilson is an International Baccalaureate World School.

Notable alumni
Mary E. Clarke, director of the Women's Army Corps and the first woman to attain the rank of major general in the United States Army
Malik Evans, 70th Mayor of Rochester
Saul A. Maneiro, Monroe County Legislator
Lovely A. Warren, 69th Mayor of Rochester, New York
Luke Wood, music executive and president of Beats Electronics from 2011 to 2020

See also
Rochester City School District
Sibley–Elmdorf Historic District

Testing 123

References

External links

Public high schools in New York (state)
Magnet schools in New York (state)
High schools in Monroe County, New York
Public middle schools in New York (state)